George C. "Jack" Guynn was the president and CEO of the Federal Reserve Bank of Atlanta from 1996 to 2006. He has retired from that position and been appointed to Oxford Industries, Inc.'s board of directors.

Education 
Guynn received a bachelor's degree in industrial engineering from Virginia Tech and also is a 1969 graduate of Georgia Tech's College of Management, from which he received an MBA.

He also received an honorary degree in Doctor of Humane Letters from Oglethorpe University in 2005.

References

External links
 Statements and Speeches of Jack Guynn

1943 births
Living people
American economists
Federal Reserve Bank of Atlanta presidents
Georgia Tech alumni